62-64 Argyle Place, Millers Point is a heritage-listed row of two terrace houses located at 62-64 Argyle Place, in the inner city Sydney suburb of Millers Point in the City of Sydney local government area of New South Wales, Australia. The property was added to the New South Wales State Heritage Register on 2 April 1999.

History 
One part of a terrace pair built  and in fairly intact exterior condition, presenting a significant facade to Argyle Place. A central park and a dominant church give Argyle Place the appearance of a typical London Square. Work on Argyle Place was commenced by Governor Macquarie however, this area was not fully formed until after cessation of quarrying at nearby rockface. First tenanted by the NSW Department of Housing in 1982.

Description 
Two storey mid-Victorian terrace constructed , decorative window surrounds to top floor. Cast iron lace and posts. Two bedrooms plus sleep-out. Storeys: Two; Construction: Paint finished rendered masonry with decorative window box ledges, and key stones above arched first floor windows. Corrugated galvanised iron roof, cast iron lace columns and ground floor balustrading. Style: Victorian Italianate.

The external condition of the property is good.

Modifications and dates 
External: One cast iron column missing. Beaded timber end verandah wall has been removed. Last inspected: 19 February 1995.

Heritage listing 
As at 23 November 2000, this is a fine mid-Victorian terrace house, one of an unequal width in mostly original external condition. Building forms part of a significant streetscape element facing Argyle Place.

It is part of the Millers Point Conservation Area, an intact residential and maritime precinct. It contains residential buildings and civic spaces dating from the 1830s and is an important example of C19th adaptation of the landscape.

62-64 Argyle Place was listed on the New South Wales State Heritage Register on 2 April 1999.

See also 

Australian residential architectural styles
Undercliffe Terrace
Garrison Church, Sydney

References

Bibliography

Attribution

External links

 

New South Wales State Heritage Register sites located in Millers Point
Argyle Place, Millers Point, 62-64
Terraced houses in Sydney
Articles incorporating text from the New South Wales State Heritage Register
Italianate architecture in Sydney
Houses completed in 1864
1864 establishments in Australia
Millers Point Conservation Area